Iron Road is a 2009 Canada/China television miniseries written by Barry Pearson and Raymond Storey and directed by David Wu. Starring Sun Li, Luke Macfarlane, Peter O'Toole, Sam Neill, and Charlotte Sullivan, Iron Road chronicles the untold story of Chinese workers who helped to build the Canadian Pacific Railway in the 1880s. The mini-series was filmed in the Kamloops, B.C. area with many local actors.

Iron Road is only the second joint venture to be created under a Canada/China co-production treaty established in the 1960s. The first was 1989's Bethune: The Making of a Hero.

Plot
Iron Road follows the journey of Little Tiger (Sun Li), a child whose quest for her long-lost father takes her from a fireworks factory in China to a remote construction camp in the Rockies. Lured by the myth of the Gold Mountain (金山), she and her countrymen travel to Canada by the thousands to do the back-breaking work of blasting through the mountains to lay track. She soon learns that railroads bring fortune only to few and that every mile of track is purchased with fear and death. As treachery and prejudice threaten her, Little Tiger must use her wits and courage to fulfill her quest and honor her friends who died in this foreign land.

Little Tiger disguises herself as a man, but develops a crush on the contractor's son, James Nichol. They become friends, him treating her as just "one of the guys." At one point, he takes his clothes off and jumps into a river for a swim, asking her to join him. She declines profusely, but secretly glances at his naked form when he isn't looking. Later, she reveals to him that she is a woman and confesses her attraction. They begin an affair, which continues until disrupted when the Chinese construction foreman dies saving her when her safety rope breaks as she places dynamite charges on a cliff. It is discovered that the bookman is actually the father she has been looking for and that the rope had been sabotaged deliberately. Learning that her father's last wish was to have his ashes returned to China, she decides to leave the railway camp to do so. James wants to leave Canada with her so they can spend their lives together, but she refuses because they are from different worlds and she fears the "social implications" as Interracial relationships were generally discouraged at the time.

Cast
 Sun Li as Little Tiger
 Luke Macfarlane as James Nichol
 Peter O'Toole as Lionel Relic
 Sam Neill as Alfred Nichol
 Serge Houde as George Grant
 Charlotte Sullivan as Melanie Grant
 Tony Leung Ka Fai as Book Man
 Kenneth Mitchell as Edgar

Production
Principal photography was shot in Hengdian World Studios (China) and in British Columbia, Canada.  The Canadian shoot locations were filmed in the Kamloops area of the Thompson-Nicola Regional District and Kelowna.

Authentic wood trestle bridges built by the Canadian Pacific Railway during the Gold Rush of the early 1900s were used for film locations.

A wood-fired, steam-driven locomotive was brought in, and a section of actual railway was used, which was discontinued from service during the shoot.

The background performers cast as immigrant labourers in the Canadian shoot were mostly Asians from Vancouver, British Columbia, Canada.  An additional performer's fee was offered to those who were willing to shave their heads for an authentic period look.  Professional hairstylists were employed to hand costume the traditional Chinese long hair braid.

Awards
 Leo Award (win) Best Cinematography in a Feature Length Drama for Attila Szalay
 Leo Award (win) Best Production Design in a Features Length Drama for Linda Del Rosario
 Leo Award (win) Best Costume Design in a Feature Length Drama for Maya Mani
 Leo Award (win) Best Make-Up in a Feature Length Drama for Joanne Kinchella
Dominican Film Festival, Audience Favourite Award at the Dominican Film Festival
Roma FictionFest 2008, Best Actress, miniseries for Sun Li

References

External links

 Official site

Chinese television films
2000s Canadian television miniseries
Canadian drama television films
English-language Canadian films
Films about Chinese Canadians
Films set in Canada
Films shot in British Columbia
CBC Television original films
Canadian epic films
Television series about immigration in Canada